Adam Braidwood (born June 1, 1984) is a Canadian professional boxer, actor, martial artist and retired professional football defensive end.

He spent the entirety of his professional football career with the Edmonton Eskimos of the Canadian Football League, having started with the team in 2006.

Early career
While attending Seaquam Secondary School in Delta, Braidwood got his start in major football competition when he attended Washington State University, making their football squad as a true freshman in 2002 (and making the conference all-freshman team). Over the course of his collegiate career, Braidwood recorded 13.5 sacks, 8.5 of which came in his senior year where he started all thirteen games and was among the top ten in the Pacific-10 conference in tackles.

Professional football career

Braidwood was drafted first overall by the Edmonton Eskimos in the 2006 Canadian College Draft. Despite playing college football in the United States, as a Canadian-born player he was considered a non-import under CFL roster rules.

At 6'4" and 250 pounds, Braidwood was known for his strength on the outside. He is the two-time winner of the strongest man award at Washington State. He recorded his first professional touchdown on September 8, 2006, recovering a fumble from Calgary Stampeders quarterback Henry Burris and taking it into the endzone during the rematch of the Labour Day Classic in Edmonton.

Professional boxing career
Braidwood is currently the first ranked heavyweight in Western Canada and the ninth ranked overall with KO boxing and The Firm Sports Management. In 2009, Braidwood defeated Devon Garnon by KO. More recently, December 2015, the former Edmonton Eskimo fought Paul MacKenzie (P-Mac), defeating him by TKO.

In March 2016, Braidwood's fight against Victor Välimäki came to a decision at the end of the third round. Since then, the heavyweight has consistently won by TKO, maintaining an almost-perfect record of wins by TKO in 2016. In June 2016, Braidwood defeated Todd Stoute by KO at 3:00 of round 2. Braidwood added another win to his record in September 2016, when he knocked out Adam Queried at 2:30 of the first round. Again, Braidwood emerged victorious over Lee Mein at 2:07 in the first round on December 2, 2016, in Edmonton, AB . This year, Braidwood has racked up four more victories, making him the number one heavyweight in Western Canada.

Braidwood defeated Eric Martel Bahoeli on February 24, 2017, to win the WBU Heavyweight Title, in Quebec City making him the number one heavyweight boxer of the WBU. Bahoeli was ranked seventh (11-6-1) at the time of the fight in World Boxing Union (WBU) ranks. The 12-round title fight lasted a total of 5 rounds (2:50), before finally knocking him out. In the 4th round, Braidwood sustained a large cut above one of his eyes from a series of seconds in which he taunted Bahoeli to "hit me harder." It was a violent matchup, but it is no surprise that Braidwood emerged victorious, as he packs one of the heaviest punches in the league.

On June 16, 2017, he competed against Tim Hague in Edmonton. Hague suffered a serious brain injury in the fight, and died two days later in a nearby hospital.

Legal troubles
On November 23, 2010, Braidwood and two other men were charged after an incident late the previous Friday afternoon in Spruce Grove, Alberta.

On April 19, 2013, Braidwood was sentenced to 4 1/2 years for sexually assaulting a former girlfriend.

On September 10, 2013, Braidwood pleaded guilty to other remaining Alberta charges and sentencing proceeded. The sentence ran concurrently with his other convictions.

In June 2018, Braidwood was arrested and charged for assaulting a girlfriend and parole violations. He served four months in prison and was released October 2018.

In June 2019, Braidwood was charged for domestic assault and forcible confinement to another girlfriend. On July 6, 2020 he pleaded guilty to assault charges.

In December 2019, Braidwood violated parole conditions of no contact and was arrested and charged with breach of parole and intimidation of justice. On November 25, 2020, he pleaded guilty to charges.

Championships and accomplishments
 World Boxing Union
 WBU Heavyweight Championship (One time)

Professional boxing record

Mixed martial arts record

|-
|Win
|align=center|1–0
|Ryan Jimmo
|TKO (punches)
|MFC 11: Gridiron
|
|align=center|1
|align=center|1:54
|Edmonton, Alberta, Canada
|

References

External links
 
 
 

1984 births
Canadian football defensive linemen
Canadian male mixed martial artists
Canadian male boxers
Heavyweight boxers
Edmonton Elks players
Living people
People from Richmond, British Columbia
Players of Canadian football from British Columbia
Sportspeople from British Columbia
Washington State Cougars football players